You Are Waltari is the 14th album by the Finnish metal band Waltari, released by Rodeostar records in 2015.

Track listing
 12	 
 Tranquality		 
 Solutions		 
 Only the Truth		 
 Mountain Top		 
 Right Wing Theme
 Strangled		 
 Keep it Alive		 
 Singular		 
 Not Much to Touch You		 
 Hyvä Oli Hyvä Oli	 
 Drag		 
 Televizor		 
 Diggin the Alien

Personnel
 Kärtsy Hatakka — lead vocals, bass, keyboards 
 Jariot Lehtinen — guitars, backing vocals 
 Sami Yli-Sirniö — guitars, backing vocals 
 Ville Vehviläinen — drums 
 Kimmo Korhonen — guitars, backing vocals 
 Nino Silvennoinen — guitars, backing vocals 
Jani Hölli — keyboards

References

Waltari albums
2015 albums